Pati Patni Aur Woh may refer to:
 Pati Patni Aur Woh (1978 film), an Indian film directed by B. R. Chopra
 Pati Patni Aur Woh (TV series), a 2009 Indian reality television series
 Pati Patni Aur Woh (2019 film), an Indian film, remake of the 1978 film